In Folly's Trail is a 1920 American silent drama film directed by Rollin S. Sturgeon and written by Doris Schroeder. The film stars Carmel Myers, Thomas Holding, Arthur Clayton, George B. Williams, Viola Lind, and W.H. Bainbridge. The film was released on September 6, 1920, by Universal Film Manufacturing Company.

Cast         
Carmel Myers as Lita O'Farrell
Thomas Holding as Charles Howard
Arthur Clayton as Ronnie
George B. Williams as Max Goldberg
Viola Lind as Mavis
W.H. Bainbridge as Col. Houston
Beth Ivins as Pattie Houston

References

External links

1920 films
1920s English-language films
Silent American drama films
1920 drama films
Universal Pictures films
Films directed by Rollin S. Sturgeon
American silent feature films
American black-and-white films
1920s American films